A Rodeo Film is a 2019 American drama short film written and directed by Darius Dawson and produced by Ryan Binse. The film was released on HBO Max on February 2, 2021.

Plot 
A bull rider no longer in love with the sport chooses between his family's rodeo legacy and his own life aspirations.

Cast 

 Jermelle Simon as Averill
 Phrederic Semaj as Harland
 Charlee Earle as Frankie

Production 
Principal photography took place near San Diego. The film was inspired by Christopher Nolan and Dawson's time living in Singapore. It was made at the American Film Institute. Dawson hopes it raises awareness about black cowboy culture and rodeo athletes.

Release 
A Rodeo Film screened at Toronto Black Film Festival, Urbanworld Film Festival, Prison City Film Festival and BronzeLens Film Festival and was distributed on February 2, 2021 by HBO Max.

Reception

Dawson won the West Region's African American Student Film Award at the Directors Guild of America Awards and Best Student Film at GI Film Festival San Diego.

References

External links
 
 
 

2019 short films
American drama short films
Films shot in San Diego
Films set in San Diego
African-American drama films
2019 drama films
Race films
Bull riding
Rodeo in film
HBO Films films
Cowboy culture
American drama television films
2010s English-language films
2010s American films